Dave Pym is a lacrosse coach, currently serving as the video coach and Western scout for the Buffalo Bandits of the National Lacrosse League. Pym previously served as the head coach of the Calgary Roughnecks. He was hired by the Roughnecks after a successful junior coaching career with the Burnaby Lakers of the BC Junior A Lacrosse League, where his team won multiple Minto Cups. Despite great regular season success, Pym's teams had trouble winning in the playoffs, and as a result, Pym's contract was not renewed after a loss to the Edmonton Rush in the 2012 playoffs.

NLL Coaching Record

References

Living people
Year of birth missing (living people)
Place of birth missing (living people)

Buffalo Bandits coaches
Calgary Roughnecks coaches